Lungri is a Rural municipality located within the Rolpa District of the Lumbini Province of Nepal.
The rural municipality spans  of area, with a total population of 23,631 according to a 2011 Nepal census.

On March 10, 2017, the Government of Nepal restructured the local level bodies into 753 new local level structures.
The previous Wadachaur, Pang, Sirpa, Harjang and Gumchal VDCs were merged to form Lungri Rural Municipality.
Lungri is divided into 7 wards, with Wadachaur declared the administrative center of the rural municipality.

Demographics
At the time of the 2011 Nepal census, Lungri Rural Municipality had a population of 23,631. Of these, 99.4% spoke Nepali, 0.4% Gurung and 0.2% other languages as their first language.

In terms of ethnicity/caste, 46.7% were Chhetri, 31.6% Magar, 11.9% Kami, 3.1% other Dalit, 2.0% Damai/Dholi, 1.9% Sanyasi/Dasnami, 1.5% Gurung, 0.5% Hill Brahmin, 0.3% Majhi and 0.5% others.

References

External links
official website of the rural municipality

Rural municipalities in Rolpa District
Rural municipalities of Nepal established in 2017